Tektites (from  , meaning 'molten') are gravel-sized bodies composed of black, green, brown or grey natural glass formed from terrestrial debris ejected during meteorite impacts. The term was coined by Austrian geologist Franz Eduard Suess (1867–1941), son of Eduard Suess. They generally range in size from millimetres to centimetres. Millimetre-scale tektites are known as microtektites.

Tektites are characterized by:
 a fairly homogeneous composition
 an extremely low content of water and other volatiles
 an abundance of lechatelierite
 a general lack of microscopic crystals known as microlites and chemical relation to the local bedrock or local sediments
 their distribution within geographically extensive strewn fields

Characteristics 

Although tektites are superficially similar to some terrestrial volcanic glasses (obsidians), they have unusual distinctive physical characteristics that distinguish them from such glasses. First, they are completely glassy and lack any microlites or phenocrysts, unlike terrestrial volcanic glasses. Second, although high in silica (>65 wt%), the bulk chemical and isotopic composition of tektites is closer to those of shales and similar sedimentary rocks and quite different from the bulk chemical and isotopic composition of terrestrial volcanic glasses. Third, tektites contain virtually no water (<0.02 wt%), unlike terrestrial volcanic glasses. Fourth, the flow-banding within tektites often contains particles and bands of lechatelierite, which are not found in terrestrial volcanic glasses. Finally, a few tektites contain partly melted inclusions of shocked and unshocked mineral grains, i.e. quartz, apatite, and zircon, as well as coesite.

The difference in water content can be used to distinguish tektites from terrestrial volcanic glasses. When heated to their melting point, terrestrial volcanic glasses turn into a foamy glass because of their content of water and other volatiles. Unlike terrestrial volcanic glass, a tektite produces only a few bubbles at most when heated to its melting point, because of its much lower water and other volatiles content.

Classification 

On the basis of morphology and physical characteristics, tektites have traditionally been divided into four groups. Those found on land have traditionally been subdivided into three groups: (1) splash-form (normal) tektites, (2) aerodynamically shaped tektites, and (3) Muong Nong-type (layered) tektites. Splash-form and aerodynamically shaped tektites are only differentiated on the basis of their appearance and some of their physical characteristics. Splash-form tektites are centimeter-sized tektites that are shaped like spheres, ellipsoids, teardrops, dumbbells, and other forms characteristic of isolated molten bodies. They are regarded as having formed from the solidification of rotating liquids, and not atmospheric ablation. Aerodynamically shaped tektites, which are mainly part of the Australasian strewn field, are splash-form tektites (buttons) which display a secondary ring or flange. The secondary ring or flange is argued as having been produced during the high-speed re-entry and ablation of a solidified splash-form tektite into the atmosphere. Muong Nong tektites are typically larger, greater than 10 cm in size and 24 kg in weight, irregular, and layered tektites. They have a chunky, blocky appearance, exhibit a layered structure with abundant vesicles, and contain mineral inclusions, such as zircon, baddeleyite, chromite, rutile, corundum, cristobalite, and coesite.

Microtektites, the fourth group of tektites, are less than 1 mm in size. They exhibit a variety of shapes ranging from spherical to dumbbell, disc, oval, and teardrop. Their colors range from colorless and transparent to yellowish and pale brown. They frequently contain bubbles and lechatelierite inclusions. Microtektites are typically found in deep-sea sediments that are of the same ages as those of the four known strewn fields. Microtektites of the Australasian strewn field have also been found on land within Chinese loess deposits, and in sediment-filled joints and decimeter-sized weathering pits developed within glacially eroded granite outcrops of the Victoria Land Transantarctic Mountains, Antarctica.

Occurrence 

Most tektites have been found within four geographically extensive strewn fields: the Australasian, Central European, Ivory Coast, and North American. As summarized by Koeberl, the tektites within each strewn field are related to each other with respect to the criteria of petrological, physical, and chemical properties, as well as their age. In addition, three of the four strewn fields have been clearly linked with impact craters using those same criteria. Recognized types of tektites, grouped according to their known strewn fields, their associated craters, and ages are:
 Australasian strewnfield (The impact crater was located in 2019 after a decades-long search. Approximate age: 0.77–0.78 million years):
 Australites (Australia, dark, mostly black);
 Indochinites (South East Asia, dark, mostly black);
 Philippinites (Philippines, black).
 Central European strewnfield (Nördlinger Ries impact crater (24 km), Germany, age: 15 million years):
 Moldavites (Czech Republic, green).
 Ivory Coast strewnfield (Lake Bosumtwi impact crater (10 km), Ghana, age: 1 million years):
 Ivorites (Ivory Coast, black).
 North American tektite strewn field (Chesapeake Bay impact crater (40 km), United States – age: 34 million years):
 Bediasites (Texas – black to dark brown, some with metallic finish);
 Georgiaites (Georgia – green).

Comparing the number of known impact craters versus the number of known strewn fields, Artemieva considered essential factors such as the crater must exceed a certain diameter to produce distal ejecta, and that the event must be relatively recent. Limiting to diameters 10 km or more and younger than 50 Ma, the study yielded a list of 13 candidate craters, of which the youngest eight are given below. 

Preliminary papers in the late 1970s suggested either Zhamanshin or Elgygytgyn as the source of the Australasian strewnfield.

Povenmire and others have proposed the existence of an additional tektite strewn field, the Central American strewn field. Evidence for this reported tektite strewn field consists of tektites recovered from western Belize in the area of the villages of Bullet Tree Falls, Santa Familia, and Billy White. This area lies about 55 km east-southeast of Tikal, where 13 tektites, two of which were dated as being 820,000 years old, of unknown origin were found. A limited amount of evidence is interpreted as indicating that the proposed Central American strewn field likely covers Belize, Honduras, Guatemala, Nicaragua, and possibly parts of southern Mexico. The hypothesized Pantasma Impact Crater in northern Nicaragua might be the source of these tektites.

Age 

The ages of tektites from the four strewnfields have been determined using radiometric dating methods. The age of moldavites, a type of tektite found in the Czech Republic, was determined to be 14 million years, which agrees well with the age determined for the Nördlinger Ries crater (a few hundred kilometers away in Germany) by radiometric dating of Suevite (an impact breccia found at the crater). Similar agreements exist between tektites from the North American strewnfield and the Chesapeake Bay impact crater and between tektites from the Ivory Coast strewnfield and the Lake Bosumtwi Crater. Ages of tektites have usually been determined by either the K-Ar method, fission-track dating, the Ar-Ar technique, or combination of these techniques. Tektites in geological and archaeological deposits have been used as age markers of stratified deposits, but this practice is controversial.

Origins

Terrestrial source theory 

The overwhelming consensus of Earth and planetary scientists is that tektites consist of terrestrial debris that was ejected during the formation of an impact crater. During the extreme conditions created by a hypervelocity meteorite impact, near-surface terrestrial sediments and rocks were either melted, vaporized, or some combination of these, and ejected from an impact crater. After ejection from the impact crater, the material formed millimeter- to centimeter-sized bodies of molten material, which as they re-entered the atmosphere, rapidly cooled to form tektites that fell to Earth to create a layer of distal ejecta hundreds or thousands of kilometers away from the impact site.

The terrestrial source for tektites is supported by well-documented evidence. The chemical and isotopic composition of tektites indicates that they are derived from the melting of silica-rich crustal and sedimentary rocks, which are not found on the Moon. In addition, some tektites contain relict mineral inclusions (quartz, zircon, rutile, chromite, and monazite) that are characteristic of terrestrial sediments and crustal and sedimentary source rocks. Also, three of the four tektite strewnfields have been linked by their age and chemical and isotopic composition to known impact craters. A number of different geochemical studies of tektites from the Australasian strewnfield concluded that these tektites consist of melted Jurassic sediments, or sedimentary rocks that were weathered and deposited about 167 Mya. Their geochemistry suggests that the source of Australasian tektites is a single sedimentary formation with a narrow range of stratigraphic ages close to 170 Mya, more or less. This effectively refutes multiple impact hypotheses.

Although the formation and widespread distribution of tektites is widely accepted to require the intense (superheated) melting of near-surface sediments and rocks at the impact site and the following high-velocity ejection of this material from the impact crater, the exact processes involved remain poorly understood. One possible mechanism for the formation of tektites is by the jetting of highly shocked and superheated melt during the initial contact/compression stage of impact crater formation. Alternatively, various mechanisms involving the dispersal of shock-melted material by an expanding vapor plume, which is created by a hypervelocity impact, have been used to explain the formation of tektites. Any mechanism by which tektites are created must explain chemical data that suggest that parent material from which tektites were created came from near-surface rocks and sediments at an impact site. In addition, the scarcity of known strewn fields relative to the number of identified impact craters indicate that very special and rarely met circumstances are required for tektites to be created by a meteorite impact.

Nonterrestrial source theories 

Though the meteorite impact theory of tektite formation is widely accepted, there has been considerable controversy about their origin in the past. As early as 1897, the Dutch geologist Rogier Diederik Marius Verbeek (1845–1926) suggested an extraterrestrial origin for tektites: he proposed that they fell to Earth from the Moon. Verbeek's proposal of an extraterrestrial origin for tektites was soon seconded by the German geologist Franz E. Suess. Subsequently, it was argued that tektites consist of material that was ejected from the Moon by major hydrogen-driven lunar volcanic eruptions and then drifted through space to later fall to Earth as tektites. The major proponents of the lunar origin of tektites include NASA scientist John A. O'Keefe, NASA aerodynamicist Dean R. Chapman, meteorite and tektite collector Darryl Futrell, and long-time tektite researcher Hal Povenmire. From the 1950s to the 1990s, O'Keefe argued for the lunar origin of tektites based upon their chemical, i.e. rare-earth, isotopic, and bulk, composition and physical properties. Chapman used complex orbital computer models and extensive wind tunnel tests to argue that the so-called Australasian tektites originated from the Rosse ejecta ray of the large crater Tycho on the Moon's near side. O'Keefe, Povenmire, and Futrell claimed on the basis of behavior of glass melts that the homogenization, which is called "fining", of silica melts that characterize tektites could not be explained by the terrestrial-impact theory. They also argued that the terrestrial-impact theory could not explain the vesicles and extremely low water and other volatile content of tektites. Futrell also reported the presence of microscopic internal features within tektites, which argued for a volcanic origin.

At one time, theories advocating the lunar origin of tektites enjoyed considerable support as part of a spirited controversy about the origin of tektites that occurred during the 1960s. Starting with the publication of research concerning lunar samples returned from the Moon, the consensus of Earth and planetary scientists shifted in favor of theories advocating a terrestrial impact versus lunar volcanic origin. For example, one problem with the lunar origin theory is that the arguments for it that are based upon the behavior of glass melts use data from pressures and temperatures that are vastly uncharacteristic of and unrelated to the extreme conditions of hypervelocity impacts. In addition, various studies have shown that hypervelocity impacts are likely quite capable of producing low-volatile melts with extremely low water content. The consensus of Earth and planetary scientists regards the chemical, i.e. rare-earth, isotopic, and bulk composition evidence as decisively demonstrating that tektites are derived from terrestrial crustal rock, i.e. sedimentary rocks, that are unlike any known lunar crust.

See also 
 Darwin glass
 Edeowie glass
 Fulgurite
 Impact event
 Impact crater
 Libyan desert glass

References

Notes

Literature

Books 
 Barnes, V., and M. Barnes (1973) Tektites. Dowden, Hutchinson, & Ross, Inc., New York, New York. 444 pp. 
 Bouska, Vladimir (1994). Moldavites: The Czech Tektites. Stylizace, Prague, Czechoslovakia. 69 pp.
 Heinen, Guy (1998) Tektites – Witnesses Of Cosmic Catastrophes. Guy Heinen, Luxembourg. 222 pp.
 McCall, G.J.H. (2001) Tektites in the Geological Record. The Geological Society of London, London, United Kingdom. 256 pp. 
 McNamara, K., and A. Bevan (1991) Tektites, 2nd ed. Western Australian Museum, Perth, Western Australia, Australia. 28 pp.
 O'Keefe, J. A. (1976) Tektites And Their Origin. Elsevier Scientific Publishing Company, Amsterdam, Netherlands. 266 pp. 
 Povenmire, Hal (2003) Tektites: A Cosmic Enigma. Florida Fireball Network, Indian Harbour Beach, Florida. 209 pp.

External links 

Faul, Henry. (1966) The Virgil E. Barnes Tektite Collection Tektite Information Page. Texas Natural Science Center, University of Texas, Austin, Texas.
 Anonymous (ndb) Tektite Information Solving The Tektite Puzzle. the Meteorite Exchange.
 Anonymous (ndc) Part III: The Leap to Space: 1959–1965 (on Chapman's work)'' Adventures in Research: A History of Ames Research Center 1940–1965, NASA History Program Office.
 Jakiel, R. (1997) Meteorites from Earth: The Tale of Tektites. Georgia Mineral Society.
 Ralph, J., and I. Chau (2012) Tektite., Mindat.org.
 Schneider, D.M. (2002) Tektites. The Meteoritical Society.
 Weir, D. (2012) Tektites and Other Impact-Related Material. Meteorite Studies Collection Classification.
 Whymark, A. (nd) Introduction to Tektites. Tektites.co.uk.

Amorphous solids
Glass in nature
Impact event minerals